Regis Rowland Malady (February 9, 1917 – May 1, 1985) was a Democratic member of the Pennsylvania House of Representatives.

See also
 Regis R. Malady Bridge

References

Democratic Party members of the Pennsylvania House of Representatives
1917 births
1985 deaths
20th-century American politicians